John Blakey (born 24 July 1966) is a former Australian rules footballer who played 359 games in the Australian Football League.

Football career

Playing
Recruited from East Doncaster, Victoria, Blakey debuted for the Fitzroy Football Club in 1985, and went on to be used in a variety of midfield positions. He went on to play 135 games (for 38 goals) with the Fitzroy Lions until 1992. He switched to the North Melbourne Football Club in 1993 and went on to be a stalwart for the club. He played in the 1996 and 1999 premiership sides and went on to play 224 games for 72 goals until he retired in 2002 at 36 years of age. His total of 359 games places him 12th on the list of most games in VFL/AFL football and has played the most games in the VFL/AFL without playing in a draw.

He represented Victoria in State of Origin in 1998.

Coaching and support
Following his retirement, Blakey became the assistant coach at the Brisbane Lions in 2003 and coached the team when he filled in as caretaker interim senior coach in the absence of regular senior coach Leigh Matthews whose mother had died, for one game in Round 18, 2005 against the Western Bulldogs in which the Lions lost.

Statistics

Playing statistics

|- style="background-color: #EAEAEA"
! scope="row" style="text-align:center" | 1985
|style="text-align:center;"|
| 54 || 4 || 0 || 1 || 21 || 21 || 42 || 7 || — || 0.0 || 0.3 || 5.3 || 5.3 || 10.5 || 1.8 || —
|-
! scope="row" style="text-align:center" | 1986
|style="text-align:center;"|
| 18 || 23 || 2 || 3 || 166 || 135 || 301 || 66 || — || 0.1 || 0.1 || 7.2 || 5.9 || 13.1 || 2.9 || —
|- style="background:#eaeaea;"
! scope="row" style="text-align:center" | 1987
|style="text-align:center;"|
| 18 || 11 || 2 || 0 || 67 || 64 || 131 || 24 || 12 || 0.2 || 0.0 || 6.1 || 5.8 || 11.9 || 2.2 || 1.1
|-
! scope="row" style="text-align:center" | 1988
|style="text-align:center;"|
| 18 || 20 || 6 || 7 || 198 || 159 || 357 || 87 || 24 || 0.3 || 0.4 || 9.9 || 8.0 || 17.9 || 4.4 || 1.2
|- style="background:#eaeaea;"
! scope="row" style="text-align:center" | 1989
|style="text-align:center;"|
| 18 || 20 || 7 || 5 || 216 || 136 || 352 || 66 || 28 || 0.4 || 0.3 || 10.8 || 6.8 || 17.6 || 3.3 || 1.4
|-
! scope="row" style="text-align:center" | 1990
|style="text-align:center;"|
| 18 || 19 || 6 || 6 || 205 || 129 || 334 || 67 || 20 || 0.3 || 0.3 || 10.8 || 6.8 || 17.6 || 3.5 || 1.1
|- style="background:#eaeaea;"
! scope="row" style="text-align:center" | 1991
|style="text-align:center;"|
| 18 || 20 || 8 || 11 || 210 || 142 || 352 || 59 || 23 || 0.4 || 0.6 || 10.5 || 7.1 || 17.6 || 3.0 || 1.2
|-
! scope="row" style="text-align:center" | 1992
|style="text-align:center;"|
| 18 || 18 || 7 || 13 || 181 || 109 || 290 || 66 || 38 || 0.4 || 0.7 || 10.1 || 6.1 || 16.1 || 3.7 || 2.1
|- style="background:#eaeaea;"
! scope="row" style="text-align:center" | 1993
|style="text-align:center;"|
| 12 || 17 || 3 || 4 || 144 || 87 || 231 || 38 || 22 || 0.2 || 0.2 || 8.5 || 5.1 || 13.6 || 2.2 || 1.3
|-
! scope="row" style="text-align:center" | 1994
|style="text-align:center;"|
| 12 || 24 || 8 || 7 || 222 || 129 || 351 || 72 || 33 || 0.3 || 0.3 || 9.3 || 5.4 || 14.6 || 3.0 || 1.4
|- style="background:#eaeaea;"
! scope="row" style="text-align:center" | 1995
|style="text-align:center;"|
| 12 || 25 || 11 || 13 || 236 || 151 || 387 || 92 || 27 || 0.4 || 0.5 || 9.4 || 6.0 || 15.5 || 3.7 || 1.1
|-
! scope="row" style="text-align:center" | 1996
|style="text-align:center;"|
| 12 || 24 || 9 || 12 || 225 || 129 || 354 || 74 || 33 || 0.4 || 0.5 || 9.4 || 5.4 || 14.8 || 3.1 || 1.4
|- style="background:#eaeaea;"
! scope="row" style="text-align:center" | 1997
|style="text-align:center;"|
| 12 || 24 || 6 || 9 || 218 || 107 || 325 || 70 || 33 || 0.3 || 0.4 || 9.1 || 4.5 || 13.5 || 2.9 || 1.4
|-
! scope="row" style="text-align:center" | 1998
|style="text-align:center;"|
| 12 || 25 || 10 || 12 || 258 || 118 || 376 || 97 || 27 || 0.4 || 0.5 || 10.3 || 4.7 || 15.0 || 3.9 || 1.1
|- style="background:#eaeaea;"
! scope="row" style="text-align:center" | 1999
|style="text-align:center;"|
| 12 || 25 || 11 || 3 || 271 || 118 || 389 || 101 || 17 || 0.4 || 0.1 || 10.8 || 4.7 || 15.6 || 4.0 || 0.7
|-
! scope="row" style="text-align:center" | 2000
|style="text-align:center;"|
| 12 || 25 || 10 || 8 || 299 || 158 || 457 || 128 || 26 || 0.4 || 0.3 || 12.0 || 6.3 || 18.3 || 5.1 || 1.0
|- style="background:#eaeaea;"
! scope="row" style="text-align:center" | 2001
|style="text-align:center;"|
| 12 || 22 || 1 || 5 || 225 || 189 || 414 || 119 || 18 || 0.0 || 0.2 || 10.2 || 8.6 || 18.8 || 5.4 || 0.8
|-
! scope="row" style="text-align:center" | 2002
|style="text-align:center;"|
| 12 || 13 || 3 || 0 || 62 || 62 || 124 || 35 || 14 || 0.2 || 0.0 || 4.8 || 4.8 || 9.5 || 2.7 || 1.1
|- class="sortbottom"
! colspan=3| Career
! 359
! 110
! 119
! 3424
! 2143
! 5567
! 1268
! 395
! 0.3
! 0.3
! 9.5
! 6.0
! 15.5
! 3.5
! 1.2
|}

Coaching statistics

|- style="background-color: #EAEAEA"
! scope="row" style="text-align:center; font-weight:normal" | 2005*
|style="text-align:center;"|Brisbane Lions
| 1 || 0 || 1 || 0 || 0.0% ||  || 16
|- class="sortbottom"
! colspan=2| Career totals
! 1
! 0
! 1
! 0
! 0.0%
! colspan=2|
|}
* = Caretaker Coach

Personal life 
Blakey's son, Nick, was drafted by the Sydney Swans in the 2018 AFL draft.

References

External links

1966 births
Living people
Fitzroy Football Club players
North Melbourne Football Club players
North Melbourne Football Club Premiership players
Brisbane Lions coaches
Australian rules footballers from Melbourne
Victorian State of Origin players
Australia international rules football team players
Two-time VFL/AFL Premiership players
People from Doncaster, Victoria